Pleistodontes athysanus is a species of fig wasp which is native to Australia.  It has generally been collected from the syconia of Ficus brachypoda, but two individuals have been collected from F. cerasicarpa.

References 

Agaonidae
Hymenoptera of Australia
Insects described in 2002